Go Tae-seob (born March 4, 1996), professionally known as Holland, is a South Korean singer. Holland made his debut in January 2018, with the release of the single "Neverland".

Name 
Go chose Holland for his stage name as a tribute to the first country to legalize same-sex marriage.

Career
When Holland first decided to pursue music, he attempted to audition to join an entertainment company. However, no entertainment company was willing to work with an openly gay artist, so he worked two part-time jobs in order to fund his own debut single. Holland released his debut single, "Neverland", on January 21, 2018. Its music video accumulated over 1 million views in 20 hours. The music video shows Holland and his male counterpart kissing, and received a 19+ rating in South Korea.

He returned on June 6 with his next single, "I'm Not Afraid". The music video also received a 19+ rating, but it was soon after removed. His third single, "I'm So Afraid", was released on July 17. On September 6, Holland launched a crowdfunding campaign to help fund his first mini-album. He raised US$40,000 in the first 24 hours.

On March 19, 2019, Holland announced his self-titled mini album, Holland, and the tracks "Nar_C" and "Up" on his social media accounts. The album was released on March 31.

On July 8, 2019, Holland announced plans for his first tour via social media. Later on November 1, Holland  announced his first tour, "Holland: Invitation from Neverland". The tour was a collaboration with MyMusicTaste where fans voted on concert tour locations. He traveled to five cities in Europe. Months after releasing his debut mini album, Holland started teasing his next single "Loved You Better" on his social media platforms starting December 2, 2019. The song and music video were released on December 11.

Personal life
Holland is known as "the first openly gay K-pop idol". He is an only child. His parents found out about his sexuality after he discussed it in an interview. Holland, who was not home at the time, wrote a letter to his family after they found out and explained everything to them. His family tearfully accepted him, unaware of the hardships he had gone through because of his sexuality. He was a photography major at Seoul Institute of Arts, but dropped out after his debut in 2018.

Go decided to make his debut as a singer to speak out based on his experiences with violence inflicted on sexual minorities. While preparing the album, he tried to sign with several agencies, but all declined to sign him due to his desire to write music dealing with discrimination against LGBTQ people. In the end, he produced his first single with money he saved from his part-time job over the course of two years, without an agency backing him.

Discography

Singles

Music videos

Filmography

Web series

Awards and nominations

References

1996 births
Living people
South Korean pop singers
21st-century South Korean male singers
South Korean gay musicians
South Korean LGBT singers
Gay singers
20th-century South Korean LGBT people
21st-century South Korean LGBT people